In Greek mythology, Alcyone or Halcyone  (derived from ) and Ceyx were a wife and husband who incurred the wrath of the god Zeus.

Mythology 

Alcyone was a Thessalian princess, the daughter of King Aeolus of Aeolia, either by Enarete or Aegiale. She was the sister of Salmoneus, Athamas, Sisyphus, Cretheus, Perieres, Deioneus, Magnes, Calyce, Canace, Pisidice and Perimede.

Later on, Alcyone became the queen of Trachis after marrying King Ceyx. The latter was the son of Eosphorus (often translated as Lucifer). The couple were very happy together in Trachis. 

According to Pseudo-Apollodorus's account, this couple often sacrilegiously called each other "Zeus" and "Hera". This angered Zeus, so while Ceyx was at sea (in order to consult an oracle, according to Ovid), he killed Ceyx with a thunderbolt. Soon after, Morpheus, the god of dreams, disguised as Ceyx, appeared to Alcyone to tell her of her husband's fate. In her grief she threw herself into the sea. Out of compassion, the gods changed them both into "halcyon birds" (common kingfishers), named after her. Apollodorus says that Ceyx was turned into a gannet, and not a kingfisher.

Ovid and Hyginus both also recount the metamorphosis of the pair in and after Ceyx's loss in a terrible storm, though they both omit Ceyx and Alcyone calling each other "Zeus" and "Hera" (and Zeus's resulting anger) as a reason for it. On the contrary, it is mentioned that while still unaware of Ceyx's death in the shipwreck, Alcyone continued to pray at the altar of Hera for his safe return. Ovid also adds the detail of her seeing his body washed ashore before her attempted suicide. Pseudo-Probus, a scholiast on Virgil's Georgics, notes that Ovid followed Nicander's version of the tale, instead of Theodorus's starring another Alcyone.

Virgil in the Georgics also alludes to the myth - again without reference to Zeus's anger.

It is possible that the earlier myth was a simpler version of the one by Nicander, where a woman named Alcyone mourned her unnamed husband; Ceyx was probably added later due to him being an important figure in mythology and poetry, and also having a wife whose name was Alcyone (as evidenced from the Hesiodic poem Wedding of Ceyx).

Halcyon days 
Ovid and Hyginus both also make the metamorphosis the origin of the etymology for "halcyon days", the seven days in winter when storms never occur. They state that these were originally the 14 days each year (seven days on either side of the shortest day of the year) during which Alcyone (as a kingfisher) laid her eggs and made her nest on the beach and during which her father Aeolus, god of the winds, restrained the winds and calmed the waves so she could do so in safety. Aeolus controls the wind and the bird couple can nurture their young nestlings. The phrase has since come to refer to any peaceful time.  Its proper meaning, however, is that of a lucky break, or a bright interval set in the midst of adversity; just as the days of calm and mild weather are set in the height of winter for the sake of the kingfishers' egglaying according to the myth. Kingfishers however do not live by the sea, so Ovid's tale is not based on any actual observations of the species and in fact refers to a mythical bird only later identified with the kingfisher.

Interpretation 

The English poet Robert Graves, in his The Greek Myths, explained the origin of Alcyone's myth as follows:

Although one of the mythological Pleiades was indeed called Alcyone, Graves does not cite any sources to support his claim that she was their leader - or even to support the idea that they had a leader. This claim is also made in Graves's The White Goddess, but again no quotations from myths or scholiasts are given to support it.

Legacy 
 Various kinds of kingfishers are named after the couple, in reference to the metamorphosis myth:
 The genus Ceyx (within the river kingfishers family) is named after him
 The kingfisher family Halcyonidae (tree kingfishers) is named after Alcyone, as is the genus Halcyon.
 The belted kingfisher's Latin species name (Megaceryle alcyon) also references her name.
 Their story features in The Book of the Duchess.
 Their story is the basis for the opera Alcyone by the French composer Marin Marais and the cantata Alcyone by Maurice Ravel
 A collection of Canada's celebrated nature poet, Archibald Lampman, Alcyone, his final set of poetry published posthumously in 1899, highlights both Lampman's apocalyptic and utopian visions of the future.
 TS Eliot draws from this myth in The Dry Salvages: "And the ragged rock in the restless waters,/Waves wash over it, fogs conceal it;/On a halcyon day it is merely a monument,/In navigable weather it is always a seamark/To lay a course by: but in the sombre season/Or the sudden fury, is what it always was."

Gallery

See also 
 Halcyon (dialogue)

Notes

References 
 Hesiod, Catalogue of Women from Homeric Hymns, Epic Cycle, Homerica translated by Evelyn-White, H G. Loeb Classical Library Volume 57. London: William Heinemann, 1914. Online version at theoi.com 
 Hyginus, Fabulae from The Myths of Hyginus translated and edited by Mary Grant. University of Kansas Publications in Humanistic Studies. Online version at the Topos Text Project.
 Pausanias, Graeciae Descriptio. 3 vols. Leipzig, Teubner. 1903.  Greek text available at the Perseus Digital Library.
 Pseudo-Apollodorus, The Library with an English Translation by Sir James George Frazer, F.B.A., F.R.S. in 2 Volumes, Cambridge, MA, Harvard University Press; London, William Heinemann Ltd. 1921. Online version at the Perseus Digital Library. Greek text available from the same website.
 Publius Ovidius Naso, Metamorphoses translated by Brookes More (1859-1942). Boston, Cornhill Publishing Co. 1922. Online version at the Perseus Digital Library.
 Publius Ovidius Naso, Metamorphoses. Hugo Magnus. Gotha (Germany). Friedr. Andr. Perthes. 1892. Latin text available at the Perseus Digital Library.
 Publius Vergilius Maro, Bucolics, Aeneid, and Georgics of Vergil. J. B. Greenough. Boston. Ginn & Co. 1900. Online version at the Perseus Digital Library.

External links 

 Smith entry
 Images of Ceyx and Alcyone in the Warburg Institute Iconographic Database 

Aeolides
Married couples
Princesses in Greek mythology
Queens in Greek mythology
Kings in Greek mythology
Mythological lovers
Metamorphoses into birds in Greek mythology
Metamorphoses characters
Thessalian characters in Greek mythology
Thessalian mythology
Deeds of Hera
Deeds of Zeus